Arnstein Airport, formerly , was located  east of Port Loring, Ontario, Canada.

See also
Port Loring Water Aerodrome
Smoky Lake Water Aerodrome

References

Defunct airports in Ontario